Akela may refer to:

 Akela (The Jungle Book), the wolf featured in Rudyard Kipling's Mowgli stories collected in The Jungle Book and The Second Jungle Book
 Akela (Scouting), a symbol of wisdom in the Cub Scout program, usually (but not necessarily) Cubmaster or Den Leader; intentionally named after The Jungle Book character
 Akela (spider)
 Akela (film), a 1941 Indian film
 Akayla, a 1991 film
 Akella, a Russian software developing company
 Akeelah and the Bee, a 2006 family film
 , formerly steam yacht Akela, built in 1899

See also
 Akala (disambiguation)